Weigert's elastic stain is a combination of stains used in histology which is useful in identifying elastic fibers. Often orcein or a combination of resorcinol and fuchsine are used for staining. For counterstaining cell nuclei nuclear fast red or hematoxylin is also used. After applying elastic fibers show up blue coloured while cell nuclei gets red or blue.

See also
 Karl Weigert
 Masson's trichrome stain

External links

Histology
Staining